Na Hae-ryung (a.k.a. Na Hae-ryeong, born November 11, 1994), better known mononymously as Haeryung (a.k.a. Haeryeong), is a South Korean singer and actress. She made her musical debut in February 2012 as a member of EXID, leaving the group two months later to focus on education. In 2013, she signed with YNB Entertainment and debuted as a member of the band Bestie.

Biography 
Na Hae-ryung was a child actress and appeared in film and television roles, such as in the drama Magic Kid Masuri.

She was a member of girl group EXID for two months in 2012, during which time she featured on their debut single album Holla. She left the group in April 2012 and went on to join Bestie, which debuted in July 2013.

She later appeared in supporting roles in dramas including Hi! School: Love On, My Lovely Girl, and The Producers. Her first lead television role came in 2016 as Jung Kkot-nim in the KBS drama My Mind’s Flower Rain. She appeared as Jin Se-ra in the 2017 SBS drama Nothing to Lose.

Discography

Filmography

Film

Television series

Variety show

References

External links

 
 

1994 births
Living people
K-pop singers
South Korean child actresses
South Korean female idols
South Korean women pop singers
South Korean contemporary R&B singers
South Korean dance musicians
South Korean television actresses
South Korean film actresses
South Korean television personalities
EXID members
School of Performing Arts Seoul alumni